The Edward Yeakel House, at 116 Decatur St. in Brandenburg, Kentucky, was built around 1885 to 1890.  It was listed on the National Register of Historic Places in 1984.

It is Queen Anne in style.  It is two-and-a-half-stories tall, and has a three-story tower.  It was built for Edward Yeakel, a merchant in Brandenburg.  It was bought in 1920 by a Dr. Baxter, who used it for a medical office and as a residence.  The property was deemed "architecturally significant as the outstanding example of the Queen Anne style in Brandenburg."

The listing included a second contributing building, which might be either a one-story root cellar built of limestone and brick, or a one-story frame carriage house.

References

National Register of Historic Places in Meade County, Kentucky
Queen Anne architecture in Kentucky
Houses completed in 1885
1885 establishments in Kentucky
Houses in Meade County, Kentucky
Houses on the National Register of Historic Places in Kentucky
Brandenburg, Kentucky